In higher education, a men's college is an undergraduate, bachelor's degree-granting institution whose students are exclusively men.  Many are liberal arts colleges.

Around the world

In North America

United States

In the United States, co-education did not become prevalent until 1900.  Prior to that, the majority of private colleges and universities were sex-segregated. There are few remaining men's colleges in the U.S. today, most of which are Orthodox Jewish Rabbinical colleges (yeshivas).

Notable cases
United States v. Virginia, 518 U.S. 515 (1996)

See also
 Women's college
Mixed-sex education
Single-sex education

Types of university or college